Paranaleptes reticulata, known commonly as the Cashew Stem Girdler, is a species of beetle in the family Cerambycidae. It was described by Thomson in 1877. It is known from Ethiopia, Somalia, Kenya, Uganda, and Tanzania.

References

Ceroplesini
Beetles described in 1877